Vikatayogi is a 1946 Indian, Tamil-language film produced and directed by K. Subramanyam. The film featured P. U. Chinnappa and T. R. Rajakumari in the lead roles.

Cast & Crew 
The lists are adapted from the database of Film News Anandan

Cast 
P. U. Chinnappa
T. R. Rajakumari
Kumaresan
B. S. Saroja
T. R. Ramachandran
T. S. Damayanthi

Crew 
Producer &
Director = K. Subramanyam
Screenplay = M. R. Velappan Nair
Cinematography = T. S. Coatnis
Editing = R. Rajagopal
Art = T. V. S. Sarma

Production 
The story was obliquely adapted from Moliere’s play, The School for Husbands. Vikatayogi was filmed at Meenakshi Cinetone, which then became Neptune Studios and eventually Sathya Studios.

This film lofted B. S. Saroja who was performing as a group dancer earlier, to stardom.

Soundtrack 
Music was composed by Modhi Babu, Brother Lakshmanan and Radha Krishnan while the lyrics were penned by Udumalai Narayana Kavi and Rajagopala Iyer.

Trivia 
K. Subramanyam planned a film with M. K. Thyagaraja Bhagavathar in the lead and had recorded one song sung by Bhagavathar. However, he could not proceed with the film as Bhagavathar went to prison. Subramanyam used that song in this film creating an apt scene. Thus a PUC film had a Bhagavathar song in it!

References

External links 
 - Song by PUC

Indian drama films
Indian films based on plays
Indian black-and-white films
1946 drama films
1946 films
Films directed by K. Subramanyam
Films scored by Br Lakshmanan
Films scored by Moti Babu
Films scored by Radha Krishnan